Leamside railway station served the villages of Leamside and West Rainton, in County Durham, England from 1844 to 1953 on the Leamside line.

History 
The station was situated on the south side of Station Road bridge.

The freight facilities were on the up side with a goods shed. In 1913 NER statistics show that 11,128 tons of bricks and 21 wagons of livestock were handled at these goods facilities. Passenger booking plummeted from 61,571 to 5,968 in 1951. The station was closed to both passengers and goods traffic on 5 October 1953.

Members of Staff at Leamside 

James Lowrie was the station master for almost 50 years until his retirement in 1909. 

Robert Cochrane worked from 1857 to 1882, first as a Fireman and later as Signalman.

William Cowan worked as the Assistant Station Master from 1882 to 1904.

References

External links 

Disused railway stations in County Durham
Former North Eastern Railway (UK) stations
Railway stations in Great Britain opened in 1857
Railway stations in Great Britain closed in 1953
1857 establishments in England
1953 disestablishments in England